Paolo da Pergola (died 1455, Venice) was an Italian humanist philosopher, mathematician and Occamist logician. He was a pupil of Paul of Venice.

Work
Paolo da Pergola's most important work was probably De sensu composito et diviso. His logical works were printed early.

He taught at the Scuola di Rialto from 1421 to 1454. He was teacher and friend of the glassmaker Antonio Barovier.

Among his pupils was also Nicoletto Vernia, a well known professor of philosophy in Padua.

There is a memorial to him in San Giovanni Elemosinario, Venice.

Works 
 Logica; and, Tractatus de sensu composito et diviso by Paolo della Pergola, edited by Mary Anthony Brown, Saint Bonaventure, New York: Franciscan Institute, 1961.

Notes

External links
 Lewis E 165 Compendium logicae (Compendium of logic) at OPenn

1455 deaths
Italian philosophers
Scholastic philosophers
Italian logicians
15th-century Italian mathematicians
Italian Renaissance humanists
Year of birth unknown